Winds of the Pampas is a 1927 American silent drama film directed by Arthur Varney and starring Ralph Cloninger, Harry Holden, and Vesey O'Davoren.

Cast
 Ralph Cloninger as Don Rafael Casandos  
 Harry Holden as Don José Casandos  
 Vesey O'Davoren as Eusabio  
 Edwards Davis as Don Escamillo Casandos  
 Claire McDowell as Doña Maria Casandos  
 Anne Drew as Mariquita  
 Lucille McMurrin as Mercedes  
 Vicente Padula as Emilio

References

Bibliography
 Goble, Alan. The Complete Index to Literary Sources in Film. Walter de Gruyter, 1999.

External links

1927 films
Silent American drama films
American silent feature films
1927 drama films
1920s English-language films
Films directed by Arthur Varney
Films set in Argentina
American black-and-white films
1920s American films